Pujehun is the capital of Pujehun District in the Southern Province. The current estimate of the population  of Pujehun is 20,121 people.

Pujehun is a rural town and is the commercial and administrative center of Pujehun District. Pujehun lies about 50 miles south of Bo, and about 200 miles -south-east of Freetown.  The inhabitants of Pujehun are largely from the Mende ethnic group, although like with virtually all areas in Sierra Leone, the Krio language of the Sierra Leone Creole people is the most widely spoken.

History
Pujehun was named after the powerful Mende warrior Nyagua, who was residing at the nearby village of Panguma. When Nyagua and his men went to battle, they used the site of the present village as their resting place. At that time There was a lot of pepper growing in the town, which the Mende call "puei." At any time they reached that area, they called it Pujehun.

Ethnicity
The majority of the population in Pujehun are from the Mende ethnic group.

References

Populated places in Sierra Leone
Southern Province, Sierra Leone